Purapuzha  is a village in Idukki district in the Indian state of Kerala. Purapuzha could be reached by bus from Thodupuzha within 25 minutes.

Demographics
 India census, Purapuzha had a population of 12373 with 6280 males and 6093 females.

References

Villages in Idukki district